The 2nd Koshi Provincial Assembly was elected through the provincial elections held on 20 November 2022. The assembly has 56 constituency seats in which members are elected through direct elections and 36 proportional representation party list seats. The term of the assembly is 5 years unless dissolved earlier. The first session of the assembly commenced from 1 January 2023. 

Baburam Gautam of the CPN (Maoist Centre) was elected as the Speaker of the provincial assembly on 12 January 2023.

Leaders

Officers 
 Speaker of the Assembly: Hon. Baburam Gautam (CPN (Maoist Centre))
 Deputy Speaker of the Assembly: Hon. Sirjana Danuwar (CPN (UML))
 Leader of the House (Chief Minister): Hon. Hikmat Kumar Karki (CPN (UML))
 Leader of the Opposition: Hon. Uddhav Thapa (Nepali Congress)

Parliamentary party 

 Parliamentary party leader of CPN (UML): Hon. Hikmat Kumar Karki
 Parliamentary party leader of Nepali Congress: Hon. Uddhav Thapa
 Parliamentary party leader of CPN (Maoist Centre): Hon. Indra Bahadur Angbo
 Parliamentary party leader of Rastriya Prajatantra Party: Hon. Bhakti Prasad Sitaula

Chief Whip 

 Chief Whip of CPN (UML): Hon. Rewati Raman Bhandari

Composition

Members
The assembly has 93 members of whom 56 are elected through first-past-the-post voting and 37 are elected through proportional representation.

FPTP members

Source: Election Commission, Nepal and Kantipur Media Group

Proportional members
Total votes towards proportional was counted: 1,899,144

Source:

Any political party which receives votes less than 3% will not be valid to receive any proportional seat.

References

External links
सात प्रदेशसभामा एमालेले क-कसलाई पठायो ? (Eng. The Proportional candidates selected by NCP (UML) in all seven provinces.)
को-को परे समानुपातिकमा ? (Eng. Who are the candidates, selected for Proportional Representation.)

Koshi Province
Province legislatures of Nepal
Government of Koshi Province
Unicameral legislatures